Jorge Luis Montes Nieves is a Mexican psychologist and politician, member of the Movimiento Regeneración Nacional (Morena) party. He is a federal deputy for the period 2018 to 2021.

Biography 
Jorge Luis Montes Nieves has a degree in Clinical Area Psychology from the Universidad Autónoma de Querétaro, and has diplomas in Health and Gender, Alcoholism and Drug Addiction, Mental Health, and High School Education. He has exercised his career in a particular way, from 2004 to 2005 he was a psychologist at the DIF in Ezequiel Montes, Querétaro and in 2005 he was a psycho-pedagogical advisor at the Colegio de Bachilleres de Querétaro.

From 2014 to 2017 he was secretary of Sexual Diversity of the municipal committee of Morena in Ezequiel Montes, in the elections of 2015 he was a candidate for local deputy, not having achieved the victory, and from 2017 to 2018 he was state advisor and member of the commission of Partisan Ethics of Morena.

In 2018, he was a candidate for federal representative for the coalition Juntos Haremos Historia (Together we will make history) for the 2nd District of Querétaro; elected to the LXIV Legislature, which will run from that year to 2021. In the Chamber of Deputies he is a member of the commissions of Education; of Regime, Regulations and Parliamentary Practices; and of Housing.

On May 16, 2020, he denounced having been arbitrarily detained by police officers from the state of Querétaro, without respect for his parliamentary immunity; this fact was condemned by the leader of Morena's deputies, Mario Delgado Carrillo, and the president of the Chamber of Deputies, Laura Rojas Hernández.

References 

Living people
Place of birth missing (living people)
Date of birth missing (living people)
Year of birth missing (living people)
Mexican psychologists